Darkness Falls is a 1999 drama film by John Howlett, very loosely adapted from N. J. Crisp's psychological thriller Dangerous Obsession and directed by Gerry Lively. The film was shot in late 1997 on the Isle of Man.

Plot
With his pregnant wife at death's door after a car crash, desperate husband John Barrett (Winstone) invades the home of Mark Driscoll (Dutton) and holds both Driscoll and his rich, neglected wife Sally (Fenn) hostage in order to understand the events that led to his wife ending up in a coma.

Featured cast

References

External links
Official site at Vine International Pictures

 

1999 films
1999 independent films
1990s psychological thriller films
British independent films
Lionsgate films
British films based on plays
Films shot in the Isle of Man
1990s English-language films
Films directed by Gerry Lively
1990s British films